Wojciech Kozub (born 20 July 1976) is a Polish biathlete. He competed at the 1998 Winter Olympics and the 2002 Winter Olympics.

References

1976 births
Living people
Polish male biathletes
Olympic biathletes of Poland
Biathletes at the 1998 Winter Olympics
Biathletes at the 2002 Winter Olympics
People from Nowy Targ County